The Dayton Sharks were a professional indoor football team based in Dayton, Ohio. The team was a member of the Continental Indoor Football League (CIFL). The franchise started as an expansion team in the CIFL during the 2013 season. The Sharks were the fifth indoor football team to be based in Dayton, the first being the Dayton Skyhawks of the original Indoor Football League. The Skyhawks were followed by the Dayton Warbirds, who later became the Dayton Bulldogs, of the National Indoor Football League the third being the Cincinnati Marshals who played their 2007 season in Dayton and the fourth being the Dayton Silverbacks who played from 2006 to 2012. The Owner of the Sharks was CA Sports Entertainment LLC. The Sharks played their home games at Hara Arena in nearby Trotwood, Ohio.

Franchise history

2013 play begins

In July 2012, the team announced CA Sports Entertainment LLC. was awarded an expansion franchise in Dayton, Ohio and that the team would be named the Dayton Sharks. The Sharks filled the void left after the Dayton Silverbacks folded at the conclusion of the 2012 season. The team was led by Corwyn Thomas, who was the team's Managing General Partner, CEO and Chairman. The team signed many local players, who have a track record for success, such at Tommy Jones and Robert Redd. The Sharks had a great start to the season, going 8−0 before losing to the Erie Explosion and the Kentucky Xtreme in the final two weeks. With an 8–2 record, the Sharks had won the 2 seed for the CIFL playoffs, but due to a scheduling conflict with Hara Arena, the Sharks played their playoff game at the Saginaw Sting. The Sting would go on to upset the Sharks, scoring twice in the final minute to defeat their former quarterback Jones.

2014

In June 2013, the Sharks agreed to terms with the CIFL to return for the 2014 season.

Logos and uniforms
When the Dayton Sharks were announced, the ownership stated the franchise would be red, black and silver, but after a month changed the colors to be blue, black and silver. The team also introduced a new logo at that time, a Shark with the text "Sharks" underneath it.

Notable players

Final roster

Awards and honors
The following is a list of all Dayton Sharks players who have won league Awards

All-League players
The following Sharks players have been named to All-League Teams:
 QB Tommy Jones (2)
 RB Derrick Moss (1)
 WR Robert Redd (1), Kenyez Mincy  (1), Eugene Cooper (1), Derrick Shearer (1)
 OL Andrew Phelan (1), Frank Straub (1), Josh Ellison (1)
 DL James Spikes (1)
 LB Santino Turnbow (1)
 DB Mike Davis (1), Viterio Jones (1), Donte Johnson (1)

Notable coaches

Head coaches

Coaching staff

Season-by-season results

Media
 Broadcasters: Radio - Lee W. Mowen, Doug Brown, Brian Reiss
 Local media: Radio - Gem City Sports Network

References 

 
Former Continental Indoor Football League teams
American football teams in Dayton, Ohio
Defunct American football teams in Ohio
American football teams established in 2012
American football teams disestablished in 2014
2012 establishments in Ohio
2014 disestablishments in Ohio